Henrietta Baker Chanfrau (1837–1909) was an American stage actress.

Born Jeannette Davis in Philadelphia, before her marriage her stage name was Henrietta Baker. She made her début as a vocalist during the summer of 1854 at the Assembly Buildings in Philadelphia under the management of Professor Mueller.

Her first appearance at a regular theatre was at the city museum on September 9, 1854, as Miss Apsley in The Willow Copse. A short time afterward she became a member of the Arch Street Theatre, where she remained nearly two seasons. She became a member of the company when the National in Cincinnati, Ohio, was opened by Lewis Baker for the 1857–58 season.

After a long absence from New York City, in late 1886 she appeared at the reopening of the Fourteenth Street Theatre as Linda Colmore in The Scapegoat.

She married actor Frank Chanfrau in July 1858. She died in Burlington, New Jersey, September 21, 1909.

Notes

References
 
 University of Washington:  Digital Collections Search for "Henrietta Chanfrau"

External links
Sarony portrait, and flip side

1837 births
1909 deaths
19th-century American actresses
American stage actresses
Actresses from Philadelphia
Date of birth unknown
Date of death unknown